Hiram Lee "Doc" Jones (born 7 November 1937) is an American United Methodist leader and retired US Air Force chaplain.

Personal life
In Madisonville, Texas, on 7 November 1937, Hiram Lee Jones was born to Ada (born ) and Dan L. Jones (born ).  By the 1940 United States Census, Jones had two siblings: brother Jim Dand (born ) and sister Doris Marie (born ), and the family lived on a farm in rural Madison County, Texas.

Jones graduated from Madisonville High School.  He later earned a Bachelor of Science from Sam Houston State University in 1959, and was ordained in the United Methodist Church in 1963.  Jones received a Master of Divinity (M.Div.) from Perkins School of Theology, and after spending six years serving civilian parishes, he joined the United States Air Force in 1969.  Wiley College awarded Jones an honorary Doctor of Divinity in 1974.   By January 1997, Jones was an ordained Elder in the United Methodist Church.  After his retirement, Jones and his wife moved to Greater Houston in 1999.

US Air Force

After joining in 1969, Jones spent that May through July 1985 as a Protestant chaplain at Kincheloe, Andrews, Kalkar Kaserne, Bergstrom, and Maxwell Air Force Bases.  From July 1985 – July 1991, Jones served in the office of the command chaplain for Pacific Air Forces (at Hickam Air Force Base) and Air Training Command (at Randolph Air Force Base).  After a two-year stint as the senior chaplain at Bolling Air Force Base, Jones was the command chaplain for United States Air Forces in Europe (at Ramstein Air Base) and Air Combat Command (at Langley Air Force Base) from June 1993 – June 1997.

In June 1997, Jones was made the Deputy Chief of Chaplains of the United States Air Force and assigned to Washington, D.C.  In that capacity at the turn of the 21st century, when USA Today made news reporting on Wiccan airmen at a South Carolina Air Force base, Deputy Chief Jones told the investigating US senator—Strom Thurmond—that, "if you can tell us what religion America's religious freedom doesn't cover, we won't let them practice it."

Jones retired from the Air Force on 1 December 1999.  Among the awards and decorations earned by General Jones were an Air Force Distinguished Service Medal, a Legion of Merit, eight Meritorious Service Medals, an Air Force Commendation Medal, three Air Force Outstanding Unit Awards, two Air Force Organizational Excellence Awards, and a National Defense Service Medal.

References

External links
 

1937 births
American United Methodist clergy
brigadier generals
Deputy Chiefs of Chaplains of the United States Air Force
living people
military personnel from Texas
people from Madisonville, Texas
Perkins School of Theology alumni
recipients of the Air Force Distinguished Service Medal
recipients of the Legion of Merit
Sam Houston State University alumni